Ploskovo is a rural locality (a village) in Bogorodskoye Rural Settlement, Ust-Kubinsky District, Vologda Oblast, Russia. The population was 20 as of 2002.

Geography 
Ploskovo is located 76 km northwest of Ustye (the district's administrative centre) by road. Yezovo is the nearest rural locality.

References 

Rural localities in Ust-Kubinsky District